Pengajaran dan Pembelajaran Sains dan Matematik Dalam Bahasa Inggeris  (PPSMI) (the teaching and learning of science and mathematics in English) is a government policy aimed at improving the command of the English language among pupils at primary and secondary schools in Malaysia. In accordance to this policy, the Science and Mathematics subjects are taught in the English medium as opposed to the Malay medium used before. This policy was introduced in 2003 by the then-Prime Minister of Malaysia, Mahathir Mohamad. PPSMI has been the subject of debate among academics, politicians and the public alike, which culminated to the announcement of the policy's reversal in 2012 by the Deputy Prime Minister, Muhyiddin Yassin.

History
PPSMI's inception as a Malaysian Government policy was the result of the Cabinet meeting on 19 July 2002 under the administration of the fourth prime minister, Mahathir Mohamad. According to the Malaysian Ministry of Education, the policy would be run in stages, starting with the 2003 school session, pioneered by the all students of Year 1 in primary education level, and Form 1 of the secondary education level. PPSMI was then fully implemented to all secondary students in 2007, and to all primary students in 2008.

Objective
According to the statement regarding PPSMI in the Ministry of Education's website:

When proposing the policy, Mahathir Mohamad was in the opinion that Malaysia's progress is declining in the age of globalisation, and he had hoped that this policy gives a competitive edge to the nation, following the footsteps of Singapore and India which are moving forward because of their utilisation of the English language.

Implementation
PPSMI was implemented for the 2003 school session students enrolling in Year 1 and Form 1 in primary and secondary schools respectively. Students of other grades are not affected, and continued to study Mathematics and Science in the mother tongue. PPSMI learning materials were offered in the form of packages consisting of these components:
 Textbooks: Given to students as the basic source for learning on concepts and skills in Science and Mathematics.
 Activity Books: Given as supplementary material for students to practice their understanding of the concepts learned from textbooks. These "Buku Latihan dan Aktiviti" or "BLA" were provided for students of Year 1 only.
 Teacher's Guide: Material prepared for teachers as reference and guide to plan and implement effective teaching of the Science and Mathematics.
 MyCD or "Pupil's CD-ROM": "BLA" in the form of multimedia presentations recorded in compacts discs and included with every Activity Book. The contents consists of an interactive games and simulators as well as electronic tests.
 Teacher's CD-ROM: This material was meant to help teachers  to plan and implement effective teaching of the Science and Mathematics. Among the contents are questions banks, additional activities as well as URLs to websites with relevance to the subject. These CDs are included in the Teacher's Guide.
 Science Practical Book: Published to ensure that Science are taught not only in theory but also in practice.
 Glossary Book: A reference guide containing definition to terms pervasive in Science and Mathematics.

As for the implementation in Chinese schools, after a protest was made by the nation's union of Chinese schools Dong Jiao Zong, a compromise was reached where the teaching of Science and Mathematics was made done both in English and Mandarin.

References

Education policy in Malaysia